John Francis Joseph Toye (7 October 194212 November 2021) was a British development economist and political economist who served as a director at the Institute of Development Studies at the University of Sussex and at the Centre for the Study of African Economies at the University of Oxford. As a development economist, he studied the impact of multinational agencies like the World Bank and the International Monetary Fund on developing economies. Toye is credited with the shaping of development studies as a discipline including serving as the president of UK's Development Studies Association.

Some of Toye's prominent works included Dilemmas of Development (1987) and Aid and Power (1991).

Early life 
Toye was born on 7 October 1942 in Wisbech in Cambridgeshire in the United Kingdom, to Adele (née Francis) and Jack Toye. His mother was a teacher while his father was an engineer. Toye studied at the Christ's College, Finchley in North London, and went on to study history at the University of Cambridge.

Career 
He started his career as a civil servant with the UK Treasury between 1965 and 1968 before going on to being a development specialist with the University of Cambridge between 1972 and 1980, the University of Swansea between 1982 and 1987, where he was the director at the Centre for Development Studies. He also served as a director at the Institute of Development Studies at the University of Sussex between 1987 and 1997, and as the head of the Centre for the Study of African Economies at the University of Oxford between 2000 and 2003.He was a member of the UNCTAD's Globalisation and Development Directorate between 1998 and 2000, and was the chair of Oxford's International Development Advisory Council from 2009 to 2015.   

Toye's work focused on development economics, studying the economies of developing economies. He did this by studying the impact of multinational agencies like the World Bank and the International Monetary Fund on developing economies. In the late 1980s and early 1990s, he focused his studies on agencies like World Bank and their role in pushing for free-market economics principles on developing economies. This was the basis of his book Aid and Power (1991) which he co-wrote with economists Jane Harrigan and Paul Mosley. The book also studied the conditionality expressed as a part of grants and loans from these agencies. Earlier, in the 1980s, he wrote Dilemmas of Development (1987) in which he countered the prevailing thinking of free-market economists. In a critique against free-market advocates of the time, he wrote that they "first turn liberty against equality and fraternity, then overthrow liberty itself". In the book, he tracked the early days of neoliberalism and the impact of the philosophy on international development.

Toye is credited with shaping development studies as a discipline, serving as the president of the Development Studies Association, driving research on the topic, and being a member of the editorial boards of European Journal of Development Studies, Journal of Development Studies, Journal of International Development, Oxford Development Studies, and World Development. Toye was also amongst the first social scientists to identify the importance of growing economic linkages between Africa and China. The field would develop into a significant development research area in subsequent years.

Personal life 
Toye married Janet (née Reason) in 1967. The couple had two children. He died on 12 November 2021 at the age of 79. In addition to his research, his colleagues recounted his knowledge of wine lists, sense of humour, and his 'dram of whisky'.

Select works

References 

1942 births
2021 deaths
Alumni of the University of Cambridge
British development economists
People from Wisbech
People educated at Christ's College, Finchley
Academics of the University of Sussex